Svaneti Range is an 85 km long sub-mountain range of the Greater Caucasus, in the Svaneti region of Georgia, located south of the main Caucasus ridge in a west–east direction. 

The Svaneti Range runs along the border between the regions of Racha-Lechkhumi and Kvemo Svaneti and Samegrelo-Zemo Svaneti (North and South Svaneti) in the north of Georgia. It forms the watershed between the Enguri River (to the north and west) and the Tskhenistsqali (to the south). The right Tskhenistsqali tributary Cheledula separates the mountains from the further south Egrisi Range. The Svanetic Mountains reach a maximum altitude of 4009 m at the Lahili Peak. The ridge is partially glacier.

Geology 
Svaneti Range  is composed mainly of sedimentary ( mica, schist ) and  partly of metamorphic rocks ( quartzite , slate ).

Vegetation
On the slopes grow subalpine and alpine vegetation.  
The slopes of the Svaneti Range at lower elevations  are  covered with forests of beech, spruce and fir.

References

Mountain ranges of Georgia (country)
Glacial landforms